Handsome Eddy is a hamlet in Sullivan County, New York,  United States.

It has frequently been noted on lists of unusual place names.

References

Hamlets in Sullivan County, New York